NGC 2623/Arp 243 is an interacting galaxy located in the constellation Cancer. NGC 2623 is the result of two spiral galaxies that have merged. Scientists believe that this situation is similar to what will occur to the Milky Way, which contains the Solar System, and the neighboring galaxy, the Andromeda Galaxy in four billion years. Studying this galaxy and its properties have provided scientists with a better idea of the coming collision of the Milky Way and the Andromeda. Due to NGC 2623 being in the late stage of merging, the compression of the gas within the galaxy has led to a large amount of star formation, and to its unique structure of a bright core with two extending tidal tails.

Discovery 

NGC 2623 was discovered on January 19, 1885, by the French astronomer Édouard Jean-Marie Stephan. A significant discovery made within NGC 2623 was SN 1999gd. SN 1999gd is a Type 1a Supernova, and was discovered in 1999. This supernova is the result of the fusion of both the elements carbon and oxygen, which causes a gravitational collapse of the core of the white dwarf causing it to collapse.

Appearance 

The center of NGC 2623 is very bright and circular, and connected to it are two elongated tails, called tidal tails, of star clusters. Because of how bright it is, it is classified as a super luminous galaxy. The galaxy is very bright for both the radio waves and infrared waves it emits. There are two very distinct features of the X-rays that NGC 2623 emits. One is the spectral hard and compact, nuclear feature, and the other one is a cool feature that is not located in the nucleus. The cool feature of the X-rays is similar to X-ray outflows, that are observed around many other starburst galaxies, and this specific cool feature has a very diffuse structure is believed to be observed ejected gas, that comes from the inefficiency of star formation, as the process can't turn all matter into stars, therefore ejecting excess gas by supernova explosions, and stellar and galactic winds.

Merging 
NGC 2623 is in the late stage of merging, and is called a titanic galaxy merger. The centers of the galaxies that have formed NGC 2623 have already collided, forming the bright and circular center of NGC 2623, which is very prominent. One true nucleus is believed to exist in this galaxy, and it is symmetric. There have been inferences made that state that the merger  should create a region of both compressed gas and dust, due to the observations that gas clouds are colliding within NGC 2623.

Properties

Physical properties 
NGC 2623 spans 50 thousand light years.

The infrared luminosity of this galaxy is 3.3×1011 L☉ (solar luminosity). This level of emission is seen in Seyfert galaxies, whose cores are especially bright.

The distance modulus is 34.50.

Classification 
The nucleus of this galaxy is filled with many young stars, due to the star formation caused by the merger. Because there is such a large amount, NGC 2623 is classified as a Seyfert galaxy. Seyfert galaxies have very bright cores and similar properties to quasars. Both are nuclei of galaxies that contain active super massive black holes and emit very high levels of energy. Seyfert galaxies, such as NGC 2623, tend to emit a much lower amount of visible light. Seyfert galaxies are relatively uncommon as only 2 percent of spiral galaxies fall under this classification.

Star formation 

In NGC 2623 there are bright star clusters in the tails of the galaxy, and many of them are situated in the upper tail. There are at least 170 star clusters within the galaxy. In addition to this both tails contain many young stars in their respective early stages in evolution. The most active part of the galaxy in regards to star formation is the upper and more prominent tail. Through HST and GALEX, which are two space telescopes, images it is evident that recent star formation has occurred within the galaxy.  Though there are many star clusters in the tails of NGC 2623, the nucleus, or center of the galaxy still is responsible for more than 99 percent of the star formation occurring.

Tidal tails 
The large trails of gas on each end of NGC 2623 are known as tidal tails. Tidal tails are long strips of bright star clusters that occur due to the interactions between different galaxies. In the case of this galaxy, the tidal tails are formed due to the merging of the galaxies that formed NGC 2623. Tidal tails are very strong indicators of whether a galaxy has been formed due to the merging of multiple other galaxies. Tidal tails can also be seen in the Antennae galaxy, as they were also formed by the merging of galaxies, similar to how NGC 2623 was formed. Tidal tails are helpful to astronomers as they can indicate the formation and evolution of a galaxy.

Environment 
NGC 2623 is located in the direction of the constellation Cancer at a distance of 253 million light years from the Earth. It travels away from the Earth at a speed of approximately 5,500 kilometers per second.

See also
 List of galaxies

References

External links
 

Cancer
Intermediate spiral galaxies
Interacting galaxies
Peculiar galaxies
Luminous infrared galaxies
2623
243
04509
24288
Galaxies discovered in 1885